Arvind Venkat (born ) is an American physician and politician. A member of the Democratic Party, he represents the 30th district in the Pennsylvania House of Representatives, which comprises the North Hills suburbs of Pittsburgh in Allegheny County. Before entering politics, Venkat was an attending physician at Allegheny General Hospital, specializing in emergency medicine.

Early life and education 
Venkat was born and raised in Detroit, Michigan by Indian immigrant parents. He attended Detroit Country Day School for high school, graduating in 1992. Venkat graduated from Harvard University in 1996 with a Bachelor of Arts degree in History and Science and a Master of Arts degree in History of Science. He then attended Yale School of Medicine where he graduated with a medical degree in 2000.

Medical career 
Venkat completed his residency in emergency medicine at the University of Cincinnati Academic Health Center in 2004.

Venkat is an emergency room physician affiliated with the Allegheny Health Network, which includes Allegheny General Hospital as its flagship hospital. He is also a professor of emergency medicine at Drexel University College of Medicine. From 2019 to 2020, Venkat served as president of the Pennsylvania chapter of the American College of Emergency Physicians (ACEP), and in 2020, he was elected to the board of ACEP.

Pennsylvania House of Representatives

Elections

2022 
On February 24, 2022, Venkat announced his campaign for the Pennsylvania House of Representatives in the 30th district, which contains Ben Avon, Ben Avon Heights, Emsworth, Franklin Park, Kilbuck Township, McCandless, and Ohio Township, as well as parts of Hampton Township. The 30th district was an open seat in 2022, since Republican incumbent Rep. Lori Mizgorski, who due to redistricting no longer resided in the district, opted instead to run for the state senate against incumbent Lindsey Williams. Election analysts predicted that the general election would be competitive and presented a pickup opportunity for the Democratic Party.

In his announcement, Venkat said that he was motivated to run to address issues that often intersected with his work as an emergency physician, especially those that were exacerbated by the COVID-19 pandemic; he identified strengthening emergency medical services and other first responder services, expanding access to affordable healthcare, and upgrading infrastructure as some of his priorities. Venkat also voiced his support for voting rights protections, gun control, and efforts to combat climate change.

In the aftermath of the U.S. Supreme Court decision Dobbs v. Jackson Women's Health Organization, which overturned Roe v. Wade and threatened abortion rights in many states where the Republican Party controlled one or more branches of state government, Venkat spoke in favor of protecting abortion rights in Pennsylvania; he highlighted his perspective as a candidate with a medical background, recounting an experience where he treated a patient who needed emergency care following a covert, self-induced abortion.

Venkat was unopposed in the Democratic primary. He faced Republican former Allegheny County councilmember Cindy Kirk in the general election, prevailing by a margin of over 10 percentage points.

Committee assignments

Tenure 

Upon taking office, Venkat became the first state representative of Indian-American descent in state history, as well as the first licensed physician in the state legislature in 60 years.

Personal life 
Venkat resides in McCandless, Pennsylvania with his wife Veena and their three children.

Electoral history 

| colspan="6" style="text-align:center;background-color: #e9e9e9;"| Democratic primary election

| colspan="6" style="text-align:center;background-color: #e9e9e9;"| General election

References

External links 

Campaign website

Living people
21st-century American physicians
21st-century American politicians
American emergency physicians
American physicians of Indian descent
American politicians of Indian descent
Asian-American people in Pennsylvania politics
Democratic Party members of the Pennsylvania House of Representatives
Drexel University faculty
Harvard College alumni
Pennsylvania Democrats
People from Allegheny County, Pennsylvania
Physicians from Detroit
Physicians from Pennsylvania
Politicians from Detroit
Yale School of Medicine alumni
Year of birth missing (living people)
Physicians from Michigan